"Como la Flor" ("Like the Flower") is a song that was recorded by American singer Selena for her third studio album Entre a Mi Mundo (1992). It was written by A. B. Quintanilla and Pete Astudillo. The song was conceptualized in 1982 after A. B. saw a family selling illuminated plastic flowers at a concert in Sacramento, California. In 1992, an infectious melody stuck in A. B's head; he ran from the shower of their hotel room in Bryan, Texas, pulled out a keyboard, and immediately began working on it with Astudillo. It took A. B. 20 minutes to complete the music and took Astudillo another hour to complete the lyrics. It is an up-tempo, Tejano cumbia torch song that fuses tropical and cumbia rhythms with reggae and pop music. In the song's lyrics, the female protagonist addresses her former lover, who abandoned her for another partner. The narrator is unsure of her ability to love again, though wishing her former partner and his new lover the best.

"Como la Flor" received widespread acclaim from music critics, who praised Selena's emotional delivery of the song's lyrics of heartbreak and loss. At the Premio Lo Nuestro 1993, the song won Regional Mexican Song of the Year. It was nominated for Single of the Year at the 1993 Tejano Music Awards but was removed in preliminaries; a move music critic Rene Cabrera criticized. The song peaked at number six on the US Billboard Hot Latin Songs chart and became one of the most-played songs on Latin music radio stations in Texas. José Behar booked Selena for a press tour in Monterrey, Mexico; following Selena's visit, the song peaked at number three on Mexico's Grupera Songs chart, becoming her first commercially successful single in the country. 

Since its introduction as part of Selena's live set list and as its popularity grew, she either opened or closed her concerts with "Como la Flor". During her live performances, the song was often played in a down-tempo form while Selena performed a flamenco-inspired floreo hand gesture. Selena followed this with her enunciations of agony and the beating of her chest, singing "como me duele" ("how it hurts me") before the song's tempo becomes upbeat. Music critics and scholars received Selena's performances with critical acclaim, and found them an encapsulation of Latino mournfulness and praised her stage presence, choreography, and emotional tones. The song was the closing number of Selena's final live performance in Bryan, on March 19, 1995; she was shot and killed on March 31. It has been regarded as Selena's signature song and her "trademark", and has become her posthumous epithet and swan song. The recording has become one of her "most celebrated songs" and has since become part of the Texas musical cannon. 

In 2018, Rolling Stone named "Como la Flor" one of the best Latin pop songs. Several artists have recorded cover versions of the song; these include Jackie Cruz, Ángela Aguilar, and Cristian Castro. Selena's performances of the recording were dramatized by Jennifer Lopez in the 1997 Warner Bros. biopic film and in 2020 by Christian Serratos in Netflix's Selena: The Series. The New York Times writer Joe Nick Patoski named his biography of Selena "Como la Flor". Contemporary reviews have been positive; essayist Ilan Stavans said the emergence of Latin pop in the United States in the 1990s is attributed to the popularity of "Como la Flor". Scholar Deborah Parédez attributed the song's success to Selena's use of under-explored genres of African American music in Tejano music. The Recording Industry Association of America (RIAA) has certified "Como la Flor" 9x Platinum (Latin). The song currently holds the Guinness World Record for the most video uploads of people lip syncing to a single song in one hour.

Background and inspiration 

Following the 1981 recession in Texas, former musician Abraham Quintanilla, decided to promote his children's band Selena y Los Dinos. Due to the recession, the Quintanilla family were evicted from their home, and performing became their primary source of income. In 1982, Selena y Los Dinos and three other Mexican bands performed in Sacramento, California. After their performance, at the nightclub where they were performing, A. B. Quintanilla saw a family selling illuminated plastic flowers. He conceived a repetitive rhythm and the title "flor" ("flower"), though he found the title "plastic flower" lyrically unappealing. A. B. promised himself he would one day write a song about a flower.

In 1992, following a concert, the band stayed overnight at a hotel in Bryan, Texas, before traveling to Houston the next day. While at the hotel, A. B. had an infectious melody he could not quieten. He ran out of the shower, pulled out a keyboard, and began working on it, along with backup vocalist Pete Astudillo and keyboardist Joe Ojeda. A. B. told Astudillo about his 10-year-old song idea but Astudillo initially had a different idea. Astudillo tried to use his own personal experiences for the song as he felt it would resonate better if the lyrics were based on real-life experiences. A. B. had wanted to write a song about someone receiving a flower that wilted from their lover as an analogy of the ending of the relationship. He and Astudillo decided to write about a sorrowful woman who wished her former lover well rather than someone who was better off without him. Astudillo linked the song to a Spanish-language version that predates Adele's 2012 single "Someone like You".

A. B. took 20 minutes to compose the music and another hour for Astudillo to complete the lyrics. Keyboardist Ricky Vela said he went out to eat and the song was finished when he returned. During the recording sessions, Selena left the studio without finishing the backing vocals. A. B. said: "homegirl just bounced on me, she said, 'I'm out of here, I'm going to the mall." He corrected the tune and later recorded the backing vocals to finish the song. Ojeda provided arrangement assistance for "Como la Flor". A. B. created a formula to help himself write "Como la Flor" and other recordings that are "simple, catchy little [songs]" by emphasizing "melody line, synth hooks and basic instrumentation". He believed writing simplistic lyrics is "what sells". "Como la Flor" was recorded at Manny Guerra's AMEN Studios.

Music and lyrics 

Musically, "Como la Flor" is primarily a Tejano cumbia torch song. American scholar Deborah Parédez described it as a transnational fusion between tropical and cumbia rhythms with reggae and pop music. Tejano music journalist Ramiro Burr called the track a "pop polka", while it included the incorporations of pop, disco, and R&B. "Como la Flor" is "equally catchy" to "La Carcacha", though the music was done "slow and easy". Mike Hazelwood of Tulare Advance - Register called "Como la Flor" a Tejano recording that is "infectious enough" to be appreciated by listeners outside its genre. It is written in the key of B major and composed in  time signature. The song has a moderate tempo of 92 beats per minute, while Selena's vocals span from F3 to B4. "Como la Flor" has an upbeat production, a "lively tempo", a danceable, synthesizer-based, pop-cumbia beat, and a banda keyboard sound. The recording highlights Selena's "trademark cumbia rhythm". Chris Pérez, guitarist and widower of Selena, described the melody as simple and melancholic; he called the song a "heart-wrenching ballad", while Parédez referred to it as a "captivating ballad". Nathan Smith of Texas Music Magazine, called the song a "heartfelt, pop-tinged Tejano ballad". Selena "mixes pop vocalism" and displays a "boo-hooing cadence" that is consistent with ranchera songs. The recording makes use of a tessitura that invites participation; its chorus has catchy, call-and-response lyrics. Writing for the San Antonio Express-News, Burr enjoyed the song's "memorable melodic hook" that he felt "had listeners whistling along". Soraya Nadia McDonald of The Washington Post called "Como la Flor" an "ear-wormy goodness" track. Christian Wallace of Texas Monthly called the song's  bassline "emphatic" and its beat "irresistible". "Como la Flor" encompasses "beauty and ephemerality", a clichéd association because of its title, according to scholars Rosana Blanco-Cano and Rita E. Urquijo-Ruiz. Joey Guerra of the Houston Chronicle enjoyed "Como la Flor", which he called uniquely different from other Spanish-language songs.

In the lyrics, Selena's narrator addresses her former lover, who has ended their relationship. She tells him she hopes his new partner will make him happy, which the narrator was unable to do. Selena likens the end of their relationship to the wilting of a dying flower. She finds the breakup painful. Unsure of her ability to love again, the narrator says she gave her former partner all of her love, wishing him and his new lover the best. The lyrics explore the turbulence of a relationship. Selena portrays a hopeless romantic, who is content with losing a relationship "as long as she could say she had loved". Erika Ramirez of Billboard said Selena performed songs such as "Como la Flor" and "No Me Queda Mas" (1994) with "such exuberance and devotion" that they provide listeners with either nostalgia or a fantasy. Pérez called the lyrics "aching", while Wallace found them to be "plaintive" lyrics that had even "the toughest hombres" weeping. Eyder Peralta of the Houston Chronicle found the lyrics to be lovelorn, a "clean pop [offering]" that echoes works of Chelo Silva. Parédez called the lyrics self-abnegating following an unsuccessful relationship; a theme that contrasts with those of typical cumbia, salsa, and dance songs in Latin music; its lyrics more closely resemble those of pop music. Jessica Roiz of Billboard said "Como la Flor" provides a life lesson on maturely leaving a relationship, being "the bigger person" and wishing the new couple well. She found the lyrics to be empowering and positive.

According to Parédez, "Como la Flor" exemplifies a pop-cumbia song that is aimed at a wide range of musical tastes of Latinos. She said the song contains themes of longing and despair. The recording has a "residue of materiality"; with its melodic shifts, "Como la Flor" successfully "evokes Selena's presence in the elegy marking her absence". She also said listeners know it is a "multivalent emotional register and communal sensibility". "Como la Flor" has a "tensive pull" during Selena's emotional proclamations of an unrequited love. The song includes Selena's "teardrop vocals", which "captures and conveys" what Roland Barthes called "the grain of Selena's voice". "Como la Flor" provides "emotionally useful modalities" from what Jill Dolan called "utopian performatives" or Josh Kun's use of "audiotopias". Blanco-Cano and Urquijo-Ruiz said "Como la Flor" is able to "[measure and direct] the affective labor of Latinidad". Pérez said Selena's emotive vocals elevate "Como la Flor", and that he found other performances of the song could not match her emotional delivery. Sertan Sanderson of Deutsche Welle said listeners do not need to be fluent in Spanish to enjoy the song. "Como la Flor" was added to the posthumously released album Dreaming of You (1995), which was remixed by A. B., who mixed the song to match the way the band would have performed it live. According to Burr in Billboard, the song was remixed to "dilute her ethnic sound" to appeal to a mainstream audience; he said it has more "percussions to spice [the track] up".

Commercial and critical performance 
Upon its radio release in June 1992, "Como la Flor" entered at number 36 on the US Billboard Hot Latin Songs chart for the week ending July 18, 1992. The song entered the top 10 on the Hot Latin Songs chart on September 19, 1992, rising to number nine. Rene Cabrera of the Corpus Christi Caller-Times called it "a giant leap", noting the dominance of Selena and other Tejano recording artists on Billboards music charts. "Como la Flor" peaked at number six for the week ending October 24, 1992. Suzette Fernandez of Billboard magazine said the song had "made a statement in Selena's musical career" after its peak, calling it her first commercially successful single in the United States. The popularity of "Como la Flor" propelled sales of its parent album Entre a Mi Mundo, replacing La Mafia's Ahora y Siempre at number one on the Regional Mexican Albums chart. In a survey compiled by the Austin American-Statesman, "Como la Flor" was the most-played song on Tejano radio stations in Texas. It was one of the most-played songs on radio stations in Houston, Dallas, and San Francisco. In Los Angeles, California, the song was the most-played song on Latin music radio stations for three weeks beginning October 13 through the week of October 29, 1992. "Como la Flor" finished 1992 as the 31st-best-performing song on the Hot Latin Songs chart, while topping indie music charts in Texas. 

In July 1992, EMI Latin president José Behar booked Selena for a high-profile press tour in Monterrey, Mexico. In attandance were Mexican entertainment journalists, which were two-and-a-half times that of the US. A 1992 market report estimated the music market in Mexico to be valued at —more than twice the market value of the United States. Selena was not commercially successful in Mexico; a music reporter from El Sol de Monterrey showed Mexicans did not accept Selena's music. At the time, Tejanos were regarded  as "hayseed pochos" among Mexicans, a racial and social-class slur. EMI Latin executives were anxious, noting Selena's limited proficiency in Spanish could negatively trigger the Mexican media. The record company aimed to capitalize on the growing popularity of "¿Qué Creías?" (1992) and Entre a Mi Mundo, which became the first recording by Selena to appeal to audiences in Mexico. During the meet-and-greet, Selena walked in smiling and embraced all 35 press representatives, winning over the Mexican media, who hailed her as "an artist of the people", and she was booked to play at several concerts in Mexico. Following her visit, "Como la Flor" reached number five on Mexico's Grupera chart, before peaking at number three on October 12, 1992. The music report compiled by El Siglo de Torreón found "Como la Flor" to be one of the most popular songs on Mexican radio stations in 1992 and early 1993, and the most popular "grupero" (group) song in Mexico City. It was the first song by Selena "to really take off" in Mexico, while becoming her first "international hit song". The song's popularity helped Selena's commercial growth in Mexico, where it was regarded as "very popular". "Como la Flor" is considered Selena's "breakthrough hit" recording, creating her popularity with Mexican audiences.

At the Premio Lo Nuestro 1993 awards, "Como la Flor" won Regional Mexican Song of the Year. It was nominated for Single of the Year at the 1993 Tejano Music Awards. "Como la Flor" was dropped during preliminaries, which was considered a surprise according to music critic Rene Cabrera, who expected Selena to win the category. The track was nominated for Song of the Year at the 1993 Pura Vida Hispanic Awards, but lost to Emilio Navaira's "Como Le Haré". "Como la Flor" was recognized as one of the award-winning songs at the first BMI Latin Awards in 1994. Tom Whitehurst Jr of the Corpus Christi Caller-Times compared A. B.'s "famous songwriting" of the song to that of Jerry Jeff Walker's fame after writing "Mr. Bojangles" (1970). In 1993, the commercial success of "Como la Flor" led to A. B. being contracted with EMI Latin as one of their top songwriters. The contract was valued at $250,000 (1993 USD). Following the murder of Selena on March 31, 1995, "Como la Flor" debuted and peaked at number nine on the Regional Mexican Songs chart for the week ending April 15, 1995. It was the most-requested song, along with "La Carcacha", on radio stations in Mexico following the announcement of her death. Elsewhere on Billboard, "Como la Flor" peaked at number three on the US Billboard TouchTunes Latin Songs chart, which ranks the top-selling jukebox spins in the US, for the week ending December 14, 2002. "Como la Flor" peaked at number one on the US Regional Mexican Digital Song Sales chart following the 20th anniversary of Selena's death for the week ending April 18, 2015. The song peaked at number four on the Latin Digital Song Sales chart on the tracking week of December 16, 2020. As of March 31, 2020, "Como la Flor" has been streamed on Spotify 1.83 million times, and continues to receive airplay on Tejano music radio stations. The Recording Industry Association of America (RIAA) has certificated "Como la Flor"  9× Platinum (Latin), denoting 540,000 units consisting of sales and on-demand streaming in the US.

Live performances and other versions 
During her performances of "Como la Flor", Selena often performed a flamenco-inspired hand gesture called a floreo. She could be seen "turning her wrist in three  waves, elbow to fingertips twisting in a serpentine motion, fingers elongated" as she "languorously croons" the title of the song. Selena often opened "Como la Flor" with a downtempo, seductive, emotional, "mournful attenuated cadenza", taking several breaths before the song transitioned into an upbeat cumbia. The song's slow, emotive opening was described as reminiscent of "the doleful and booming voices of Mexican ranchera singers" with vocal performances that had "melodramatic flair". Selena's vocals were "achingly melodic". According to Elijah Wald of The New York Times, Selena "[emphasized] the heartache of the lyric, slowly drawing out the lines about a lover leaving, her face contorted in pain". Selena's use of dramatic pauses was similar to that of the flin styles of bolero singers Chavela Vargas and La Lupe.

In one performance, Selena was seen "smiling and even laughing" during a dramatic pause, which Wald said was Selena "reminding the audience they are all watching and enjoying this together" before her enunciation of agony and "beating her chest, murmuring the final words, como me duele ("how it hurts me"). When the song transitioned into an upbeat cumbia, Selena would sway her hips to the beat. According to Parédez, Selena's performances of the song provided audiences with "valedictory reverence, pleasurable engagement, and gestures of identification across the space of Selenidad". Parédez called Selena's performances of the song "ebullient" and equating to the "emotional register" of Latino mournfulness. Scholars Blanco-Cano and Urquijo-Ruiz agreed with Parédez's assertion, saying Selena's performance of "Como la Flor" exemplified "the emotional register and cultural codes of Latinidad". Wald noted Selena's repetitive acts on stage whenever she sang "Como la Flor", saying the performances still "feel authentic". Blanco-Cano and Urquijo-Ruiz said Selena's performances of "Como la Flor" matched the Latino expressions of longing and belonging, as well as grief and survival, noting her "easy charisma, choreographic virtuosity, [and] velvety voice" as evidence. "Como la Flor" is one of the most popular re-enactments of Selena by drag queens.

After the song was added to Selena's set lists and its popularity grew, she either opened or closed her concerts with "Como la Flor". According to Pérez, "Como la Flor" was most likely Selena's favorite song to perform. A. B. disagreed, citing Selena's irritation of constantly playing the song at every concert. Selena expressed her frustrations to A. B., saying; "I don't wanna play that song anymore, I am sick of singing [that song]". A. B. replied purchasers of a ticket to see Michael Jackson would expect to hear "Billie Jean", and that people expect to hear "Como la Flor" when they attend Selena's concerts. On February 26, 1995, Selena closed her Houston Astrodome concert with "Como la Flor" to positive reviews; Jennifer Machin of Billboard called it one of her best live performances. This was echoed by Natalie Contreras of the Corpus Christi Caller-Times, who called the performance Selena's "finest rendition". According to Blanco-Cano and Urquijo-Ruiz, it provided the audience with "the sounds of Latino desire [and witnessed] the improvised steps marking Latino loss". They said the placement of "Como la Flor" as the closing number "underscores its special status" in Selena's repertoire. On March 19, 1995, Selena performed in Bryan, where A. B. and Astudillo wrote "Como la Flor". Selena's closing performance of "Como la Flor" was her last before her murder on March 31. In "Cumbia Medley", a live medley on the Selena movie soundtrack (1997), Selena performs the song in a "soothing, elongated tempo". In the San Antonio Express-News, Burr called the song a "prime cut", finding it "electrifying and bursting with energy", and seeing a "crowning achievement" for Selena. "Con Tanto Amor Medley", a three-song medley that includes a remix of "Como la Flor" with new arrangements by A. B., was added to the greatest hits album Ones (2002). Cobo said the track was created to fit an array of Latin music radio formats, with "Como la Flor" appealing to regional Mexican music radio stations with the addition of mariachi-style trumpets.

In 1996, Jennifer Peña performed "Como la Flor", which impressed music executives in attendance. "Como la Flor" was the closing song on the Broadway musical Selena Forever (2000), starring Veronica Vasquez as Selena, and in the Mexican musical Selena, El Musical (2006), with Lidia Ávila in the title role. The recording is also the closing song of Selena ¡VIVE! (2005). Olivia Tallet and Larry Rodarte of Mi Gente magazine called it the climax of the show. Other performances include David Archuleta at the 2010 Tejano Music Awards; and Becky G at the 2018 Fiesta de la Flor. Cover versions include American actress Jackie Cruz who received a positive reception from Billboard magazine; and Angela Aguilar on her EP homage to Selena in 2020. Country singer Kacey Musgraves received critical acclaim for her redention of "Como la Flor" at one of her concerts. Elia Esperanza's performance of "Como la Flor" during her audition on the eleventh season of The Voice debuted and peaked at number 21 on the Billboard Latin Digital Song Sales chart, while Selena's version re-entered the same chart at number 12. Esperanza wanted to perform "Como la Flor" to showcase her musical abilities. Adam Levine turned first, before Blake Shelton and Miley Cyrus did, with Levine thanking her for "being different". Cristian Castro's version, a duet with Selena that was created for Enamorada de Ti (2012), received mixed reviews from music critics. The duet debuted and peaked at number 25 on the Billboard Regional Mexican Digital Song Sales chart. Castro promoted the song at the 2012 Billboard Latin Music Awards. Jennifer Lopez, who played Selena in the 1997 biopic, performed a four-song medley at the 2015 Billboard Latin Music Awards that included "Como la Flor", gaining positive reviews. Aimee Garcia performed "Como la Flor" as part of her audition to play Selena in the biopic. English YouTube video producers the Kabs Family uploaded a video of their four-year-old daughter singing "Como la Flor", which went viral in March 2021. The staff of Billboard magazine described Kabs' singing as having "so much emotion".

Legacy and impact 

A. B. said that "Como la Flor" was ahead of its time. When writing for Selena's album Amor Prohibido (1994), he said he found meeting expectations after the commercial success of Entre a Mi Mundo and "Como la Flor" challenging. When A. B. met with record executives in New York City and Nashville, they pressured him to write another successful song. He said writing a successful song following "Como la Flor" was infeasible and told Billboard that; "you don't try to outdo a hit, you just write another hit".

"Como la Flor" has been regarded as Selena's signature song and her "trademark", and has become a posthumous epithet and swan song, as well as her most popular recording. The song has enjoyed international success, and has been credited for Selena's dominance of the Latin charts. It is one of her "most celebrated" songs and has become part of the Texas musical cannon. A Santa Ana Orange County Register writer described "Como la Flor" as a Cinderella story and said it has lyrical parallels to Selena's life, saying that "by the time she blossomed, her life was cut short". Cathy Ragland of the Austin American Statesman agreed, comparing "Como la Flor" to Selena as being "a metaphor for her life—a beautiful, delicate creature", as did Raul Reyes of USA Today. According to Roiz, "Como la Flor", along with "Dreaming of You" (1995) and "Bidi Bidi Bom Bom" (1994), has "universal appeal". Burr also said "Como la Flor", among other recordings by Selena, has "instant appeal". The singer said "Como la Flor" was her "very first big record and the one that started making things click [for her and the band]". Selena's popularity substantially grew following the song's release. According to Parédez, "Como la Flor" resonated with Latinos. It established Selena in the Tejano music market, which previously dismissed her works. Along with "La Carcacha" and "Bidi Bidi Bom Bom", "Como la Flor" launched Selena's commercial Tejano career, and brought her fame in the Tejano, and Latin pop music markets.

Music executive Cameron Randle of Arista Records, said the song's use of cumbia music, which is considered a "musical passport" into Latin America, brought opportunities for Selena. Tejano cumbia is a simplified, accordion-driven, conjunto style of cumbia music. Selena transculturated Tejano cumbia by adding ska, reggae, hip-hop, and funk into her repertoire. With the additions of African-American music into Tejano cumbia, Selena was able to exploit the under-explored cultural similarities between Mexican-Americans and African Americans. According to essayist Ilan Stavans, "Como la Flor" along with "Baila Esta Cumbia" (1990) and "Bidi Bidi Bom Bom", helped bridge Tejano music and Latin pop, gave Tejano a "far brighter spotlight" in the public consciousness, and marked the emergence of Latin pop. Leila Cobo said the recording, along with "La Carcacha", is an example of Selena's best work. Throughout the 1990s, "Como la Flor" and "La Carcacha" were constantly played at parties in Latino communities in the US and Mexico. Selena bridged her Mexican-American roots with her American heritage with songs such as "Como la Flor" and "La Carcacha", which allowed her to "conquer Mexico" in the 1990s. Wallace said the song is a possible contender for official Texas state song, noting its significance at quinceaneras and proms in the state since its release.  Atlanta Journal-Constitution writers Shane Harrison, Nick Marino, and Sonia Murray chose "Como la Flor" as one of Texas' contributions to popular music.

In 1996, The New York Times writer Joe Nick Patoski, published a biography of Selena entitled Selena: Como la Flor, which literary critics considered "the most insightful portrayal [of Selena]". The city of Corpus Christi erected a life-size, bronze statue called Mirador de la Flor; years after its inception, the city erected speakers that play "Como la Flor" above the statue. In 1997, Warner Bros. released Selena, which stars Lopez in the title role. In a scene in the film, Selena manages a rowdy crowd at a fair by performing a downtempo version of "Como la Flor". Lopez portrays Selena's live performances of "Como la Flor"; after the opening chords "crest and fall", she slowly sings the song's chorus, "taking her time with each phrase". She then pulls away the microphone before singing the final line, and dramatically pauses and "cast[s] her performative spell", before the song merges into an upbeat song. Billboard called the scene one of the film's top-eight moments. During an interview with the BBC, director Gregory Nava said people in Europe would have been singing along to "Como la Flor" had Selena lived longer. In April 1997, Selena's boutique and beauty salon Selena Etc. released a perfume bottle bearing the name of the song. Selena had chosen the scents before her death. Roiz said it is a "must-have [song] in anyone's playlist". In 2016, MAC Cosmetics unveiled their Selena collection that includes a lipstick called "Como la Flor", which Selena's sister Suzette Quintanilla said is a "beautiful red-tone color, a signature color that my sister would wear when performing onstage". Greg Gonzalez, singer-songwriter of Cigarettes After Sex, wrote "Kiss It Off Me" (2019), which is inspired by "Como la Flor". In December 2020, to promote its streaming video series Selena: The Series with Christian Serratos as the title role, Netflix asked people to upload videos of themselves lip-syncing to "Como la Flor" with the hashtag "TodosComoLaFlor". Participants began uploading their videos on TikTok, reaching 250 videos per hour, a Guinness World Record. The song was used in the second season of the HBO television drama Euphoria (2021).

Credits and personnel 
Credits are adapted from the liner notes of Entre a Mi Mundo.

 Selena – lead vocals
 A.B. Quintanilla – producer, songwriter, mixing, programming, background vocals
 Pete Astudillo – songwriter

 Ricky Vela – keyboard
 Joe Ojeda – keyboard
 Chris Perez – guitar
 Brian "Red" Moore – music engineer

Charts and certifications

Weekly charts

Year-end charts

Certifications

Notes

References

Works cited

External links 
 

1990s ballads
1992 singles
1992 songs
American dance-pop songs
Boleros
Cristian Castro songs
Cumbia songs
EMI Latin singles
Pop ballads
Ranchera songs
Republic Records singles
Selena songs
Songs about heartache
Song recordings produced by A. B. Quintanilla
Songs written by A. B. Quintanilla
Songs written by Pete Astudillo
Sony Music singles
Spanish-language songs
Torch songs
Universal Republic Records singles